KFF Kukësi is an Albanian women's football club based in the city of Kukës. Formed on 13 November 2013, they play their home games at the Zeqir Ymeri Stadium and they compete in the Women's National Championship.

History

Stadium

The club play their home games at the Zeqir Ymeri Stadium, which was previously called the Përparimi stadium until 2010. There was never a stadium on the ground where the Zeqir Ymeri stands today, as the club had previously played their games on a field as there were no ground restrictions in the lower leagues for much of the history of Albanian football. In July 2010 work began to start building the stadium, which was funded jointly by the Albanian Football Association, Kukës municipality and UEFA, who invested the €300,000 needed to begin work on the stadium. The ground was given the name Zeqir Ymeri in honour of a former footballer for the club, and the opening of the stadium was on 30 November 2010, where a friendly was played against Partizani Tirana, which FK Kukësi won 1–0.

Once the club achieved promotion to the Albanian Superliga in 2012 the stadium did not meet the requirements needed to compete in the top flight, which led to further investment on the ground, which resulted in an intensive reconstruction program during the summer of 2012 in order to get the stadium ready for the 2012–13 season. The stadium was given a seated capacity of over 5,000 spectators and all the required amenities were added in order to meet the league requirements, and it was reopened on 1 October 2012 with a total reconstruction cost of €576,000.

Honours
 Albanian National Championship:
 Runners-up (1): 2014–15
 Albanian Women's Cup:
 Runners-up (1): 2014–15

Presidents

Managers

References

Kukesi
Women's football clubs in Albania
2013 establishments in Albania
Association football clubs established in 2013
Kukës